The team jumping or Prix des Nations at the 1952 Summer Olympics took place on 3 August, at the Helsinki Olympic Stadium. It was the eighth appearance of the event. For the first time, the event featured two rounds.

Competition format
The team and individual jumping competitions used the same results. The course was 786 metres long with 13 obstacles. The time limit was 1 minute, 57.2 seconds (400 m/min). Penalty points were received for obstacle faults (3, 4, 6, or 8 points based on severity) or exceeding the time limit (0.25 points per second or fraction thereof over the limit). A third refusal or jumping an obstacle out of order resulted in elimination. Scores from the two runs were added together for a total individual score. The scores from the three team members were added to give a team score.

Results

References

Sources
Organising Committee for the XV Olympiad, The (1952). The Official Report of the Organising Committee for the XV Olympiad, pp. 517, 531–34. LA84 Foundation. Retrieved 22 October 2019.

Equestrian at the 1952 Summer Olympics